Roche Caïman is an administrative district of Seychelles located on the island of Mahé. It has a football stadium where its national team play most of the home matches.

Like neighbouring Les Mamelles District, Roche Caïman District was created in 1998 from reclaimed land and from parts of Plaisance District. It does not yet have its own ISO 3166-2 code.  Its ISO 3166-2 code is SC-25 (http://www.iso.org/iso/iso_3166-2_newsletter_ii-2_2010-06-30.pdf)

References

Districts of Seychelles
Victoria, Seychelles